Joseph Conradi (1867–1936) was a Swiss-born American sculptor and architect, who designed a number of Catholic churches, schools, convents and rectories in the United States.

Personal life
Born in Berne, Switzerland, in 1867 Conradi studied in Italy and came to the U.S. in 1887, settling in St. Louis and established a practice first specializing in sculpture and later architecture. For a time he entered practice with Theodore Schrader under the name Schrader and Conradi. In about 1915 he moved to Los Angeles where he was associated with Albert C. Martin, Sr.

Works include

 St. Andrew Church, St Louis Missouri
 Most Holy Trinity Church, St Louis Missouri
 St. Matthews Parish Complex, St Louis, Missouri
 St. Aloysius Gonzaga Church, St. Louis, Missouri
 The Tower of St. Alphonsus Liguori (Rock) Church, St. Louis, Missouri
 Altar. All Saints Church Keokuk, Iowa
 St. Alphonsus Church, Chicago, Illinois (with Adam Boos)
 Holy Cross Church, St. Louis, Missouri (with Ruedell & Odenthal of Cologne)
 St. Liborius Church sculpture and convent (with Schrader, building by William Schickel)
 St. Mary of Perpetual Help Church, Villa Ridge, MO
 St. Mary Cathedral,  Wichita, Kansas
 sculpture "the spirit of progress" for the Montgomery Ward & Co. Administration Building, Chicago, Illinois
 Sacred Heart Church, Frazee, Minnesota
 sculpture for the Utah County Court House, Provo, Utah
 sculpture for St. Vincent De Paul Church, Kansas City, Missouri (with Albert C. Martin, architect)
 sculpture for Zion Lutheran Church, St. Louis Missouri (with Schrader)
 sculpture for Library of Congress, Washington DC

With Albert C. Martin Sr.:

 sculpture for Doheny Memorial Library, University of Southern California, Los Angeles, California
 fireplace for Doheny Mansion, Los Angeles, California
 sculpture for City Hall, Los Angeles, California
 sculpture for St Vincent Church, Los Angeles, California
 sculpture for Los Angeles Times Building, Los Angeles, California

References

American ecclesiastical architects
Architects of Roman Catholic churches
20th-century American architects
Architects from St. Louis
Swiss emigrants to the United States
1867 births
1936 deaths
People from Bern